Hypnotic Brass Ensemble is an eight-piece, Chicago-based brass ensemble consisting of eight sons of the jazz trumpeter Phil Cohran. Their musical style ranges from hip hop to jazz to funk and rock, including calypso and gypsy music. They call their eclectic blend of sound "now music", or "Hypnotic". Reared in the teachings of music since they were children, they grew up on the stage playing as the "Phil Cohran Youth Ensemble".

Early history
The brothers were raised in a house where music was a constant element of the household. Phil Cohran's "Circle of Sound" held rehearsals in the living room and put on live shows in the adjacent loft/theatre called the "Sun Ark". The brothers were obligated to wake at 6am  and play their horns before and after school. As adolescents, they played around Chicago as the Phil Cohran Youth Ensemble, performing for the likes of Harold Washington, Nelson Mandela, and other prominent figures of the day.

As the brothers grew into high school, many of them set their horns aside for a while. Enduring the deaths of close friends and family, including brother Anthony Neal, close friend Robert Lock (for whom they later wrote a song entitled "Flipside"), and Level Todd (for whom their song "Todd" was written), they decided to pick their horns back up. In 1999, the brothers took to the subways of Chicago and presented their music. Shortly after, they formed a fully-fledged, eight-piece brass ensemble and by 2004 recorded their first project, Flipside.

Collaborations
They have performed with Mos Def, Aquilla Sadalla,  Phil Cohran, The Recipe, Nomadic Massive, Tony Allen, Wu Tang Clan, De La Soul, Prince, Femi Kuti, Gorillaz, The B-52's, and at the North Sea Jazz Festival. They have recorded with names ranging from Snoop Dogg, Ben Billions Erykah Badu to RZA and Ghostface Killah of the Wu Tang Clan to BK-One to Childish Gambino to Maxwell. They supported Blur for their Hyde Park reunion concerts on 2–3 July 2009. They are also collaborators on a number of tracks from the third Gorillaz studio album, Plastic Beach. Their hit song "War" was featured in the box office smash The Hunger Games as the theme song for Caesar Flickerman, and on the soundtrack for season 4 of Fargo. It was sampled in "American Royalty" by Childish Gambino featuring RZA in Childish Gambino's 2012 mixtape Royalty. They collaborated on tracks with the group Rocket Juice & the Moon, a project featuring Damon Albarn (Blur, Gorillaz) on vocals/guitar/keyboard, Flea (Red Hot Chili Peppers) on bass, and legendary Afrobeat drummer Tony Allen (Fela Kuti and many others) on the group's self-titled debut album. As part of independent label Jagjaguwar's 25th anniversary, the group performed a reimagined version of Sapphie by Richard Youngs alongside Moses Sumney, Perfume Genius, and Sharon Van Etten.

Personnel
 Gabriel Hubert ("Hudah") - trumpet
 Saiph Graves ("Cid") - trombone
 Amal Baji Hubert ("Baji" or "June Body") - trumpet
 Jafar Baji Graves ("Yosh") - trumpet
 Seba Graves ("Clef") - trombone
 Tarik Graves ("Smoove") - trumpet
 Uttama Hubert ("Rocco") - baritone horn
 Hashim "Hash" Bunch - bass
 Kevin "Vo Era" Hunt - guitar
Christopher Anderson - drums

Discography

References

External links

 Hypnotic Brass Ensemble website

American brass bands
Sibling musical groups
Musical groups from Chicago